Merthyr Saints F.C. is a Welsh football club based in Merthyr Tydfil. Having previously played in the Welsh Football League the club now play in the South Wales Alliance League.

History

The club were elected to the Welsh Football League in 1995, after winning the South Wales Amateur League for the third time whilst playing under the name of Hoover Sports and sharing the use of Penydarren Park – home of Merthyr Tydfil FC. Promotion to Welsh League Division 2 followed at the first attempt.

In 2000, Hoover Sports moved to the ICI Rifle Ground in Pant, just off the A465, raising £500,000 to upgrade the facilities and changing their name to Merthyr Saints FC.

The club remained in Welsh League Division 2 for ten consecutive seasons with their highest finishing position being fifth in 2003–04. The club were relegated to Welsh League Division 3 at the end of the 2006–07 season after finishing fourth from bottom of Division 2.

At the end of 2008–09 season they were relegated from the Welsh Football League and now play in the South Wales Alliance League.

Honours

Hoover Sports
Merthyr & District League Premier Division – Champions: 1993–94
Merthyr & District League – Champions: 1971–72

Merthyr Saints
South Wales Amateur League Division One – Runners-Up: 2014–15
South Wales Amateur League Division Two – Champions: 2012–13

References

External links
Club Twitter
Club's website

Football clubs in Wales
South Wales Alliance League clubs
Welsh Football League clubs
Merthyr Tydfil
South Wales Amateur League clubs
Merthyr and District League clubs